Two ships of the Royal Navy have borne the name HMS Otus:

 was an  launched in 1928. After service in Hong Kong during WW2 she was transferred to Durban in 1943 as a training vessel. She was sold in 1946 and her hull was scuttled off Durban that year.
 was an  launched in 1962. She was paid off in 1991, and sold in 1992. She became a museum ship in 2002.

Royal Navy ship names